Marble Saga: Kororinpa is a video game for Nintendo's Wii video game console. It was released in North America on March 17, 2009, roughly two years after the original title Kororinpa: Marble Mania. The game was released in PAL regions under the title Marbles!

The game sets players on a journey to help Anthony the Ant on his quest to find the Golden Sunflower. Players must navigate their customized marble through unique and treacherous mazes to help Anthony reach his goal. The game utilizes the same world-turning technique as the first, requiring players to twist and turn the Wii Remote to control the environment.

Gameplay
In Marble Saga: Kororinpa, the player tilts the playing field, using the Wii Remote to navigate a spherical object around mazes to reach the end goal, similar to Kororinpa: Marble Mania, the preceding title. Players have also drawn similarities to the Super Monkey Ball series. Some mazes cause the player to tilt them in such a way so that a wall becomes a floor, or to interact with objects such as magnets, conveyor belts, or cannons. Depending on the difficulty level, different collectibles are available in each level. On all difficulty settings, players must collect the Yellow Crystals to complete the level. In Easy and Normal Mode, players must also collect the Stump Temple Pieces in order to unlock the game's final world. Also in Normal Mode, players can collect Green Emeralds which unlock secrets, such as new marbles or Junk for use in creation of new level editor parts. In the highest difficulty setting, players must retrieve the Colony's missing ants from each level. In addition to the collectibles, players may be awarded with bronze, silver, gold, or platinum trophies for completing levels within a predetermined amount of time. Obtaining these trophies also unlocks new balls.

The game features 7 different worlds with a variety of gadgets to help players through their journey. The game features 150+ levels with a variety of collectibles available in each mode including Yellow Crystals, Green Emeralds, Stump Temple Pieces, and eventually ants from Anthony's colony. New features for Marble Saga: Kororinpa include increased customization elements in the game. Players can design their own marble by assigning it certain attributes and techniques, and they can even place their own Mii inside the marble. A brand-new level editor has been included, allowing players to share their creations through WiiConnect24.

References

External links
Official Japanese Wii website 

2009 video games
Hudson Soft games
Konami games
Puzzle video games
Wii-only games
Wii games
Wii Balance Board games
Multiplayer and single-player video games
Nintendo Wi-Fi Connection games
Video game sequels
Marble games
Video games developed in Japan